Jordan Collier may refer to:

 Jordan Collier (The 4400), a  character in The 4400
 Jordan Collier (rugby union) (born 1994), Welsh rugby union player